Night Must Fall is a 1964 remake of the 1937 film of the same name, which was in turn based on the 1935 play by Emlyn Williams. It was directed by Karel Reisz from a script by Clive Exton and starred Albert Finney, Mona Washbourne, and Susan Hampshire, but was not as successful as the original film. The film was entered into the 14th Berlin International Film Festival.

Plot
In the woods of a Welsh suburb, a man commits an axe murder and disposes of his female victim's body and the axe in a lake. The man, later shown to be a hotel bellboy named Danny, is summoned to the home of Mrs. Bramson, a wealthy widow, whose maid, Dora, is pregnant by him.

Having charmed Mrs. Bramson, he is soon living in her house and pretends to be her son, while redecorating a room and assuming butler duties. He also woos Olivia, Mrs. Bramson's daughter. Alone in his room, he favours a hatbox, which contains the heads of his victims.

Meanwhile, the police uncover the headless body and the axe in the lake, which is bordering the property. They question Danny about the victim, who he states frequented the hotel as a prostitute. Dora discovers Danny and Olivia's relationship and rejects both of them. He begins to play odd games with Mrs. Bramson, and Olivia flees the house out of fear.

Frustrated because Mrs. Bramson grows weary of a game of chase, Danny hacks her to death. Olivia returns, sees the carnage, and summons the police. She finds Danny bathing and informs him that the police are soon to arrive. He huddles in the bathroom, withdrawn in his madness.

Cast

References

External links

 
 

1964 films
1960s thriller films
British black-and-white films
British thriller films
British remakes of American films
British films based on plays
Films directed by Karel Reisz
Metro-Goldwyn-Mayer films
Films scored by Ron Grainer
Films with screenplays by Clive Exton
1960s English-language films
1960s British films